If terminal sialic acid residues are removed from glycoproteins, the resulting proteins are known as asialoglycoproteins. 

The exposure of the subterminal galactose residues results in rapid clearance of the glycoproteins from the circulation through hepatocyte asialoglycoprotein receptors on Kuppfer cells.

External links

References 

Transmembrane proteins